Ismail bin Kijo (28 May 1952 – 3 February 2021) was a Malaysian politician who served as Member of the Selangor State Assembly for Lembah Jaya of three terms from 1995 to 2008. A member of the United Malays National Organisation (UMNO), a component of Barisan Nasional (BN) coalition, he also served as the UMNO's Ampang division chief.

Election Results

Honours

Honours of Malaysia
  :
  Medal of the Order of the Defender of the Realm (PPN) (1992)
  :
  Knight Commander of the Order of the Crown of Selangor (DPMS) - Dato' (2001)

Death
On 3 February 2021, Ismail died at Sungai Buloh Hospital at 12.30 p.m. from COVID-19 during the COVID-19 pandemic in Malaysia. He was 68.

See also
 List of deaths due to COVID-19 - notable individual deaths

External links

References

1952 births
2021 deaths
People from Selangor
Malaysian people of Malay descent
Malaysian Muslims
United Malays National Organisation politicians
Members of the Selangor State Legislative Assembly
National University of Malaysia alumni
Deaths from the COVID-19 pandemic in Malaysia
21st-century Malaysian politicians
Medallists of the Order of the Defender of the Realm
Knights Commander of the Order of the Crown of Selangor